The Sanremo Music Festival 2023 was the 73rd edition of the annual Sanremo Music Festival, a television song contest held in the Teatro Ariston of Sanremo, organised and broadcast by RAI. The show was held between 7 and 11 February 2023, and was presented for the fourth time in a row by Amadeus, who also served as the artistic director for the competition, with Gianni Morandi co-hosting.

Format 
The 2023 edition of the Sanremo Music Festival took place at the Teatro Ariston in Sanremo, Liguria, organized by the Italian public broadcaster RAI. The artistic director and the presenter for the competition was Amadeus, for the fourth consecutive year.

Presenters 
On 24 March 2022, one month after the final of the 2022 edition, RAI officially confirmed Amadeus as the presenter of the 73rd edition of the Sanremo Music Festival. Together with Amadeus, Gianni Morandi served as co-host in all five nights of the festival. Alongside Amadeus and Morandi, four co-hosts alternated during the five evenings: Chiara Ferragni (first night and final),  (second night), Paola Egonu (third night) and Chiara Francini (fourth night).

Voting 
Voting occurred through the combination of three methods:

 Public televoting, carried out via landline, mobile phone, the contest's official mobile app, and online voting.
 Jury of the press room, TV, radio and web.
 Demoscopic jury, composed by 1000 music fans who vote from their homes via an electronic voting system managed by Ipsos.

Their voting was articulated as follows:

 First two nights: half of the entrants were judged by three separate panels from the jury of the press room, TV, radio and web.
 Third night:  all of the entrants were judged through a 50/50 split system by means of televoting and the demoscopic jury. The results were combined with those of the previous nights.
 Fourth night: the same systems used on the first three nights were put in place.
 Fifth night: the entrants were judged by televoting alone, to be added up to the results obtained that far; ultimately, a final voting round (again a sum of televoting and the two juries) was held among the top 5, which determined the winner.

Selections

Sanremo Giovani 2022 
For the second time in a row, the Newcomers' section will not be included in the Festival, but a similar selection will be held to decree the six places reserved in the Big Artist section. The artists competing in the new format were selected through two separate contests: Standard section and Area Sanremo.

Standard selection 
On 26 October 2022, the RAI commission for Sanremo Music Festival 2022 announced a list of 714 acts, but only 43 artists coming from all Italian regions – excluding Basilicata and Valle d'Aosta – and from abroad were selected in the first phase.

On 5 November 2022, the RAI commission announced the eight finalists.

 Gianmaria – ""
 Giuse the Lizia – ""
 Maninni – ""
 Mida – ""

 Olly – ""
 Sethu – ""
 Shari – ""
 Will – ""

Area Sanremo 
After the auditions, a RAI commission – composed by Amadeus, Federica Lentini, Massimo Martelli and Leonardo de Amicis – identified 4 finalists for the competition among the 549 acts:

 Colla Zio – ""
 Fiat 131 – ""

 Noor – ""
 Romeo & Drill – ""

Final 
On 16 December 2022, the twelve finalists performed their songs on Sanremo Giovani 2022, broadcast on Rai 1 and presented by Amadeus. Gianmaria, Will, Olly, Colla Zio, Shari and Sethu will participate in Sanremo 2023 with a new entry.

Big Artists 
For the second year in a row, the traditional Big Artists section of the contest will be merged with the Newcomers' section, and will see the participation of 28 artists, 22 being selected among established artists and 6 qualifying from Sanremo Giovani. The former 22, selected from over 300 submissions received, were revealed on 4 December 2022, and also attended the night of Sanremo Giovani on 16 December, where their competing songs' titles were also made known.

Competing entries

Shows

First night 
The first fourteen competing artists each performed their song.

Second night 
The remaining fourteen artists each performed their song.

Third night 
All of the twenty-eight artists performed their songs once again.

Fourth night 
The artists each performed a cover of a song from the '60s, '70s, '80s, '90s, or '00s, duetting with a guest performer.

Fifth night - Final 
All of the artists performed their songs one final time, with the top five reprising their performances before moving on to the final round of voting.

Special guests

The special guests of Sanremo Music Festival 2023 included:

 Singers / musicians: Achille Lauro, Al Bano, Annalisa, Antytila, Black Eyed Peas, Blanco, Depeche Mode, Fedez, Francesco Renga, Gino Paoli, Guè, Italian Air Force Band, J-Ax, La Rappresentante di Lista, Mahmood, Måneskin, Massimo Ranieri, Nek, Ornella Vanoni, Peppino di Capri, Piero Pelù, Pooh, Salmo, Sangiovanni, Takagi & Ketra, Tom Morello
 Actors / comedians / directors / models: Alessandro Siani, Alessia Marcuzzi, Elena Sofia Ricci, Fiorello, Francesco Arca, Jody Cecchetto, Lillo, Luisa Ranieri, Mariasole Pollio, Mario Di Leva, Rocío Muñoz Morales, Roberto Benigni, cast of Mare fuori: Carolina Crescentini, Massimiliano Caiazzo, Matteo Paolillo, Nicolas Maupas, Giacomo Giorgio, Ar Tem, Domenico Cuomo, Clotilde Esposito, Maria Esposito and Kyshan Wilson
 Sports people: Antonio Fuoco, Charles Leclerc, Francesca Lollobrigida
 Other persons or notable figures: National Association , Pegah Moshir Pour, Sergio and Laura Mattarella, Volodymyr Zelenskyy (via written text)

Broadcast and ratings

Local broadcast 
Rai 1 and Rai Radio 2 brought the official broadcasts of the festival in Italy. The five evenings were also streamed online via the broadcaster's official website RaiPlay, which made it available in all member countries of the European Broadcasting Union, since the festival is broadcast on the Eurovision network.

Ratings

Notes

References 

2023 in Italian television
2023 song contests
February 2023 events in Italy
Sanremo Music Festival by year